Limnochori (before 1926: Τσερκέζκιοϊ - Tserkezkioi, alternative old name: Άγιοι Θεόδωροι - Agioi Theodoroi) is a village in Florina Regional Unit, Macedonia, Greece.

The Greek census (1920) recorded 122 people in the village and in 1923 there were 122 inhabitants (or 30 families) who were Muslim. Following the Greek-Turkish population exchange, in 1926 within Tserkezkioi there were 27 refugee families from the Caucasus and 5 refugee families from an unidentified location. In 1928, there were 37 refugee families (126 people). After the population exchange, the village mosque was demolished and replaced with a community store.

References 

Populated places in Florina (regional unit)

Amyntaio